The 2008 Turkish Cup Final was a football match between Gençlerbirliği and Kayserispor and the final of the 2007–08 Turkish Cup. Kayserispor won 11–10 on penalties.

Gençlerbirliği
Gençlerbirliği started the tournament in the second qualifying round. They beat Akçaabat Sebatspor 4-1, and proceeded to the group stage. Gençlerbirliği was put in Group B with Adana Demirspor, Trabzonspor, Manisaspor and Kırıkkalespor. Gençlerbirliği finished 1st and continued to the Quarter-finals. They beat Adana Demirspor 1-0 at home and 2-2 away. In the Semi-finals, Gençlerbirliği played Galatasaray. Gençlerbirliği won 1–0 at home and 1-1 in Istanbul. With the win over Galatasaray, they proceeded to the finals.

Kayserispor
After finishing in second place in group C, Kayserispor played and beat G.Oftaşspor 2-0. In the Semi-finals, Kayseri beat Çaykur Rizespor 3-0 away and 4-1 at home. With this win Kayseri proceeded to the final.

Final
After ending extra time with a 0–0 tie, poth teams competed in a penalty shootout. With the game tied at 10–10, Mehmet Çakır (Gençlerbirliği) missed the shot and Aydın Toscalı scored for Kayseri giving them an 11–10 victory giving Kayserispor their first Turkish Cup.

Match details

References

Turkish Cup finals
Cup
Turkish Cup final 2008
Turkish Cup final 2008
Turkish Cup final 2008